Niles Township is one of twelve townships in Delaware County, Indiana. According to the 2010 census, its population was 1,360 and it contained 566 housing units.

Geography

Cities and towns
 Albany (north half)

Unincorporated towns
 Granville

Adjacent townships
 Jackson Township, Blackford County (north)
 Richland Township, Jay County (east)
 Green Township, Randolph County (southeast)
 Delaware Township (south)
 Hamilton Township (southwest)
 Union Township (west)

Major highways
  Indiana State Road 67
  Indiana State Road 167

Cemeteries
The township contains three cemeteries: Buckles, Granville and Memorial Park.

References
 United States Census Bureau cartographic boundary files
 U.S. Board on Geographic Names

External links
 Indiana Township Association
 United Township Association of Indiana

Townships in Delaware County, Indiana
Townships in Indiana